"Il faudra leur dire" is a song by Francis Cabrel. It was released as a single (credited to Cabrel et les enfants) in 1986.

Background and writing 
The song was written and composed by Francis Cabrel himself. The recording was produced by Georges Augier.

Commercial performance 
The song reached no. 2 in France.

Track listings 
7" single CBS 650291 7 (1986)
 "Il faudra leur dire" (3:42)
 "Il faudra leur dire" (Instrumental) (3:42)

Cover versions 
The song has been recorded, among others, by Michèle Torr with Nina Vidal-Guigues, Michèle's granddaughter, Kids United with Corneille, Les Prêtres, and Vox Angeli.

Charts

Weekly charts

Year-end charts

References

External links 
 Cabrel et les enfants — "Il faudra leur dire" (single) at Discogs
 

1986 songs
1986 singles
French songs
Francis Cabrel songs
Songs written by Francis Cabrel
CBS Disques singles